Custer County is a county located in the U.S. state of Colorado. As of the 2020 census, the population was 4,704. The county seat is Westcliffe.

History
Custer County was created by the Colorado legislature on March 9, 1877, out of the southern half of Fremont County. It was named in honor of Lt. Colonel George Armstrong Custer, who had died the previous year. Originally set in Ula, the county seat moved to Rosita in 1878, and to Silver Cliff in 1886 before settling in Westcliffe in 1928.

The county was the site of a silver rush during the 1870s.  Thousands of men poured into the county during this time in the hunt for silver.  Some of the notable mines include the Geyser Mine (on the north edge of the town of Silver Cliff), the Bassick Mine (near the ghost town of Querida) and the Bull Domingo (north of Silver Cliff).

During the late 19th century a railroad line was connected through the Grape Creek Canyon but was permanently closed after a few disastrous floods.  The old railhouse has been turned into a historical landmark in the town of Westcliffe.

After the mines were exhausted, the population dropped considerably and was replaced by cattle ranchers.  An extensive system of irrigation ditches was built throughout the valley.  Ranching in the Wet Mountain Valley continues to this day.

Geography

The county is very rugged and would be virtually inaccessible without roads.

A large percentage of the county is National Forest land in the Sangre de Cristo Mountains on the west side and in the Wet Mountains on the east.  The only lake of size is the DeWeese Reservoir in the north end of the Wet Mountain Valley.

Adjacent counties
Fremont County - north
Pueblo County - east
Huerfano County - southeast
Saguache County - west

Major Highways
  State Highway 67
  State Highway 69
  State Highway 78
  State Highway 96
  State Highway 165

National protected areas
San Isabel National Forest
Sangre de Cristo Wilderness
Frontier Pathways National Scenic and Historic Byway

Bicycle trails
TransAmerica Trail Bicycle Route
Western Express Bicycle Route

Demographics

As of the census of 2000, there were 3,503 people, 1,480 households, and 1,077 families living in the county.  The population density was 5 people per square mile (2/km2).  There were 2,989 housing units at an average density of 4 per square mile (2/km2).  The racial makeup of the county was 95.89% White, 0.37% Black or African American, 1.11% Native American, 0.29% Asian, 0.71% from other races, and 1.63% from two or more races.  2.51% of the population were Hispanic or Latino of any race.

There were 1,480 households, out of which 25.50% had children under the age of 18 living with them, 64.60% were married couples living together, 5.40% had a female householder with no husband present, and 27.20% were non-families. 23.80% of all households were made up of individuals, and 7.90% had someone living alone who was 65 years of age or older.  The average household size was 2.36 and the average family size was 2.77.

In the county, the population was spread out, with 22.50% under the age of 18, 4.50% from 18 to 24, 23.30% from 25 to 44, 35.00% from 45 to 64, and 14.80% who were 65 years of age or older.  The median age was 45 years. For every 100 females there were 104.30 males.  For every 100 females age 18 and over, there were 102.00 males.

The median income for a household in the county was $34,731, and the median income for a family was $41,198. Males had a median income of $32,460 versus $20,868 for females. The per capita income for the county was $19,817.  About 9.80% of families and 13.30% of the population were below the poverty line, including 20.10% of those under age 18 and 12.60% of those age 65 or over.

Median household income (adjusted for inflation) dropped from $49,184 in 2009 to $32,261 in 2014, which made the county the third worst performing county in this respect in the country.

Government
The county is governed by three county commissioners who are elected to 4-year terms with a term limit of two.  In 2012, the county was represented by:

-District 1: Bill Canda (Republican), serving from 2017 to 2018. 1st term

-District 2: Jay Printz (Republican), serving from 2016 to 2020. 1st term.

-District 3: Tom Flower (Republican), serving from 2017 to 2020. 1st term.

There are several other public offices including Coroner, Sheriff, County Clerk and others.

Politics
Custer County is overall very conservative and heavily Republican.  The most important election is not the general election, but the primary election between members of the Republican Party in August.  During the 2004 presidential election, well over 60% of Custer County voters voted for the Republican candidates including George W. Bush and Pete Coors.

Despite the surface appearance of a homogeneous political culture, there is considerable dispute among residents over planning.  One segment of residents (which includes ranchers) would like to see the County preserved in its present state as a mountain paradise with its rural ranching culture, with strict limitation on development.  Proponents are sometimes seen as "anti-growth" and "anti-property rights."  Another segment of the population would like to see less government and less restrictions on growth and development for the growth of business and the economy.  Proponents are seen as "anti-environment" or "anti-agriculture."

Communities

Towns

Silver Cliff
Westcliffe (County seat)

Unincorporated communities

Cold Spring
Fairview
Greenwood
McKenzie Junction
San Isabel
Tanglewood Acres
Wetmore

Ghost towns

Colfax
Galena
Querida
Rosita
Ula

See also

Outline of Colorado
Index of Colorado-related articles
National Register of Historic Places listings in Custer County, Colorado

References

External links
Custer County Government website

Colorado County Evolution by Don Stanwyck
Colorado Historical Society

 

 
Colorado counties
1877 establishments in Colorado
Populated places established in 1877